Kheer, also known as payasam, is a sweet dish and a type of wet pudding popular in the Indian subcontinent, usually made by boiling milk, sugar or jaggery, and rice, although rice may be substituted with one of the following: daals, bulgur wheat, millet, tapioca, vermicelli, or sweet corn. It is typically flavoured with desiccated coconut, cardamom, raisins, saffron, cashews, pistachios, almonds, or other dry fruits and nuts, and recently pseudograins are also gaining popularity. It is typically served as a dessert.

Etymology
The word kheer is derived from the Sanskrit word for milk, kshira (क्षीर). Kheer is also the archaic name for sweet rice pudding.

Origin

Kheer was a part of the ancient Indian diet.

According to the food historian K. T. Achaya, kheer or payas, as it is known in southern India, was a popular dish in ancient India. First mentioned in ancient Indian literature, it was a mixture of rice, milk and sugar, a formula that has endured for over two thousand years. Payas was also a staple Hindu temple food, in particular, and it is served as Prasāda to devotees in temples.

See also
 Porridge
 Khira sagara
 Shir Berenj or Phirni

References

Bangladeshi rice dishes
Indian rice dishes
North Indian cuisine
Bihari cuisine
Uttar Pradeshi cuisine
Indian desserts
Nepalese cuisine
Bangladeshi desserts
Odia cuisine
Rice pudding
Telangana cuisine
Hyderabadi cuisine
Punjabi cuisine
Fijian desserts
Kerala cuisine
Tamil cuisine
Indian cuisine
Pakistani cuisine
Sri Lankan cuisine
Indo-Caribbean cuisine